Dipleurinodes nigra is a moth in the family Crambidae. It was described by Patrice J.A. Leraut in 1989. It is found on the Comoros, where it has been recorded from Grande Comore.

References

Moths described in 1989
Scopariinae